Marcel Lattès (11 December 1886 – 12 December 1943) was a French composer of film scores. He worked in French cinema during the 1930s. In 1940 following the German defeat of France, the Jewish Lattès was interned before being moved to Auschwitz Concentration Camp and killed.

Opera
Le Diable à Paris

Selected filmography 
 When Do You Commit Suicide? (1931)
 Monsieur Albert (1932)
 The Dressmaker of Luneville (1932)
 Nights in Port Said (1932)
 When Do You Commit Suicide? (1932)
 Suburban Melody (1933)
 Lucrezia Borgia (1935)
 Return to Paradise (1935)
 Helene (1936)
 The Secret of Polichinelle (1936)
 Death on the Run (1936)
 The Green Jacket (1937)
 Entente cordiale (1939)
 Metropolitan (1939)
 Fire in the Straw (1939)
 They Were Twelve Women (1940)

References

Bibliography 
 Waldman, Harry. Maurice Tourneur: The Life and Films. McFarland, 2001.

External links 
 Marcel Lattès on data.bnf.fr

Musicians from Nice
1886 births
1943 deaths
20th-century French male classical pianists
French operetta composers
20th-century French composers
French male classical composers
French film score composers
French male film score composers
French Jews who died in the Holocaust
French people who died in Auschwitz concentration camp